Alicia Amatriain (born 1980) is a Spanish ballet dancer. She is a principal dancer at the Stuttgart Ballet.

Biography
Amatriain was born in San Sebastián, Spain. She first learned ballet there and later trained at John Cranko Schule in Stuttgart. She graduated in 1998 and joined Stuttgart Ballet as an apprentice. A year later, she was promoted to the corps de ballet. In 2002, she was named principal dancer. In 2015, Amatriain was awarded , the highest honour a dancer can receive in Germany. The following year, she won a Prix Benois de la Danse for her performance in A Streetcar Named Desire and The Soldier's Tale. Amatriain has also made guest appearances in Russia, France, Cuba, Argentina and Germany. She had also appeared in Roberto Bolle's gala, Roberto Bolle and Friends.

Amatriain has danced John Cranko's works such as Tatiana in Onegin, Odette/Odile in Swan Lake and Juliet in Romeo and Juliet. She has also danced works by John Neumeier, William Forsythe and Hans van Manen. She created roles for many choreographers, including the lead role in Christian Spuck's Lulu.

In April 2022, Amatriain announced her retirement due to a hip injury.

Selected repertoire
Amatriain's repertoire with the Stuttgart Ballet includes:

A Midsummer Night’s Dream: Hermia
A Streetcar named Desire: Blanche du Bois
Afternoon of a Faun
Apollo: Terpsichore
Boléro: The Melody
Dances at a Gathering: Role in Pink and Role in Mauve
Don Quijote: Kitri
Le Grand Pas de deux
Giselle: Giselle
La Sylphide: The Sylph
Lady of the Camellias: Marguerite Gautier, Manon, Olympia
Le Sacre du Printemps: Pas de deux
Mayerling: Countess Marie Larisch
Onegin: Tatiana
Romeo and Juliet: Juliet
Serenade
The Sleeping Beauty: Aurora
Song of the Earth: female leading role
Swan Lake: Odette/Odile

Symphony in C: 1st and 2nd Movement
Theme and Variations

Created roles
A.Memory: Solo role
Arcadia
Aus Ihrer Zeit
Dark Glow
Das Fräulein von S.: diamond
Deux
Don Quijote (Maximiliano Guerra): Dulcinea
Dummy Run
E=mc²
EDEN / EDEN
Egurra
Fanfare LX
Goecke at the Kammertheater: The Nutcracker: Snow Fairy
Hamlet: Ophelia
Hikarizatto: Solo role

Il Concertone
Krabat: Worschula
Lulu. A Monstre Tragedy: title role
Miniatures
Mono Lisa
Nautilus
Nightlight
nocturne
Orlando: Queen Elizabeth I.
Orphée et Euridice: solo role
RED in 3.
Salome: The Moon
Songs
still.nest
Take Your Pleasure Seriously
The Dying Swan (Renato Arismendi after Mikhail Fokine)
The Shaking Tent
The Soldier's Tale: The Devil
Yantra

Awards and honours
, 2015
Der Faust, Darstellerin Tanz (dancer) for the devil in Demis Volpi's Die Geschichte vom Soldaten (The Soldier's Tale)
Prix Benois de la Danse, 2016
Birgit Keil Prize, 2022

Personal life
Amatriain's partner is Stuttgart Ballet soloist Alexander McGowan. In 2019, Stuttgart Ballet announced that the couple was expecting their first child. Therefore, Amatriain did not participate in the company's tour to Taiwan. In March 2020, Amatriain announced the birth of their daughter.

References

External links
Alicia Amatriain – Stuttgart Ballet profile

Living people
Spanish ballerinas
Spanish expatriates in Germany
Prix Benois de la Danse winners
Prima ballerinas
21st-century ballet dancers
21st-century Spanish dancers
Stuttgart Ballet
1980 births